The Open Flemish Liberals and Democrats (Open Vld) is a Flemish liberal political party in Belgium.

The party was created in 1992 from the former bilingual Party for Freedom and Progress (PVV) and politicians from other parties after Belgium was reconstituted as a federal state based on language, with the French-speaking faction forming the Reformist Movement (MR) in Wallonia. The party led the government for three cabinets under Guy Verhofstadt from 1999 until March 2008. Open VLD then formed the Federal Government (the so-called "Swedish government") with N-VA, CD&V and Mouvement Réformateur.

In the Flemish Parliament, the VLD formed a coalition government with sp.a-Spirit and Christian Democratic and Flemish (CD&V) from after the 2004 regional election until the 2009 regional election. Open VLD has been a member of the Leterme I Government formed on 22 March 2008, the Van Rompuy I Government formed on 2 January 2009, the Leterme II Government formed on 24 November 2009 and the Di Rupo Government formed on 6 December 2011.

Ideologically, Open VLD started as an economically liberal and somewhat libertarian Thatcherite party under its founder, Guy Verhofstadt which mirrored some of the original ideology of the PVV. The VLD rapidly became more centrist and gave up much of its free market approach, partly under the influence of Verhofstadt's political scientist brother Dirk Verhofstadt, although the VLD continued to contain conservative-libertarian and classical liberal wings with ties to think-tanks like Nova Civitas. Party chairman Bart Somers called in November 2006 for a "revolution" within the party, saying that "a liberal party", like the VLD, "can be only progressive and social".

From 2000 to 2004, during the second period of its participation in the Belgian federal government and under Belgian Prime Minister Guy Verhofstadt, the VLD allegedly lost most of its ideological appeal. Several of its thinkers such as (former member) Boudewijn Bouckaert, president of Nova Civitas, heavily criticised the party. Many others, particularly from the party's conservative and Flemish autonomist wing, resented the priority it placed on the 'Belgian compromise', which enabled the French Community's Socialist Party to gain a dominant position in the formulation of Belgian federal government policy.

In 2004, the VLD teamed up with the minority social-liberal party Vivant for both the Flemish and European elections. VLD-Vivant lost the elections to arch rivals CD&V and the Flemish Bloc. The VLD fell from second to third place among the Flemish political parties, slipping narrowly behind the sp.a-Spirit cartel. Internal feuds, the support for electoral rights for immigrants and an unsuccessful economic policy were seen as the main reasons for its election defeat. From 2007 the party kept having electoral difficulties, first due to competition from split-off List Dedecker and after 2010 from the liberal-conservative Flemish-nationalist party N-VA.

History
The VLD has its origins in the Party for Freedom and Progress (which in turn was a successor to the Liberal Party), a bilingual party which stood in both the Flemish and Walloon regions of Belgium. As such the liberal party is the oldest political party of Belgium. In 1846, Walthère Frère-Orban succeeded in creating a political program which could unite several liberal groups into one party. Before 1960, the Liberal Party of Belgium was barely organised. The school pact of 1958, as a result of which the most important argument for the traditional anti-clericalism was removed, gave the necessary impetus for a thorough renewal. During the liberal party congress of 1961, the Liberal Party was reformed into the bilingual Party for Freedom and Progress (PVV-PLP), and Omer Vanaudenhove became the chairman of the new party. The new liberal party, which struggled with an anti-clerical image, opened its doors for believers, but wasn't too concerned about the situation of workers and primarily defended the interests of employers. It is a central principle of Classical Liberalism that employers and employees do NOT have opposed long term interests.

In the late 1960s and the early 1970s, the tensions between the different communities in Belgium rose and there were disagreements within the liberal movement as well. In 1972, the unitary PVV-PLP was split into separate a Flemish and a Francophone parties. On Flemish side, under the guidance of Frans Grootjans, Herman Vanderpoorten and Willy De Clercq, the PVV was created, on Walloon side Milou Jeunehomme became the head of the PLP and Brussels got its own but totally disintegrated liberal party landscape. Willy De Clercq became the first chairman of the independent Party of Freedom and Progress (PVV). De Clercq, together with Frans Grootjans and Herman Vanderpoorten, set out the lines for the new party. This reform was coupled an Ethical Congress, on which the PVV adopted very progressive and tolerant stances regarding abortion, euthanasia, adultery, homosexuality and gender equality.

In 1982, the 29-year-old reformer Guy Verhofstadt became the chairman of the party, and even was Deputy Prime Minister and Minister of Budget from 1986 to 1988. Annemie Neyts succeeded him as chairman, becoming the first female party chairman. In 1989, Verhofstadt once more became the chairman of the PVV, after his party had been condemned to the opposition by the Christian People's Party (CVP) in 1987.

In 1992, the PVV was reformed into the Flemish Liberals and Democrats (Vlaamse Liberalen en Democraten, VLD) under the impulse of Verhofstadt. Although the VLD was the successor of the PVV, many politicians with democratic nationalist or socialist roots joined the new party. Notable examples are Jaak Gabriëls, then-president of the Flemish People's Union, and Hugo Coveliers. From the early 1990s, the VLD advanced in every election, only to get in government following the 1999 general election when the VLD became the largest party. Guy Verhofstadt became Prime Minister and Patrick Dewael became Minister-President of Flanders. They were both at the head of a coalition of liberals, social democrats and greens.

2007 elections
Before the 2007 general election, the VLD participated in a cartel with Vivant and Liberal Appeal. In February 2007, it decided to cease the cartel and start operating under the name Open VLD. On 10 June 2007 general elections, Open VLD won 18 out of 150 seats in the Chamber of Representatives and 5 out of 40 seats in the Senate.

2010 elections
In the 2010 general election, Open VLD won 13 out of 150 seats in the Chamber of Representatives. After the long government formation process, on 6 December 2011 the Di Rupo Government was formed, with Open VLD one of the six constituent parties.

Ideology and support

At its inception, the Open VLD was a classical liberal and somewhat right-libertarian party with support for free-markets and deregulation. Former party leader Guy Verhofstadt was compared to Margaret Thatcher in his beliefs during his time as party chairman. In the 1990s, the party switched from a libertarian to a more socially liberal position under Bart Somers. Some of the party's ideological influences have been Karl Popper, John Stuart Mill, Thomas Paine, Amartya Sen and Martha Nussbaum. The party also contained members from both social democratic and Flemish nationalist liberal-conservative backgrounds who have influenced the VLD's course, such as former Volksunie leader Jaak Gabriëls and Hugo Coveliers falling into the latter camp. Others had ties to the conservative-libertarian organization Nova Civitas, and were open to working with the Vlaams Blok and later Vlaams Belang party, although this was strongly opposed by the party leadership as a whole. Presently, the Open VLD retains an economically liberal position by supporting lower taxes and private property ownership while also closing tax loopholes. It supports a Canadian model of migration and for a more inclusive society towards immigrants, but claims not to endorse open borders and wants quicker deportation of illegal immigrants. It also retains a socially liberal stance on matters such as same-sex marriage, LGBT rights and introducing a third gender option on official documents, but also believes the government shouldn't interfere with matters related to sexuality. For a period, the party was considered the main centre-right rival to the Christian Democratic CD&V in the Flemish region and saw its highest period of support in the late 1990s and early 2000s. However, the emergence of the Flemish nationalist N-VA party and the LDD drew some of the party's conservative leaning voters away and contributed to a decline in votes. Ideological disputes also caused some of the party's more conservative and traditionalist libertarian wing such as Boudewijn Bouckaert, Jean-Marie Dedecker and Hugo Coveliers to leave the party. Dedecker later founded the LDD and Coveliers VLOTT while others joined the N-VA.

Representation in EU institutions
The party is fairly pro-European, and sits in the Renew Europe group with two MEPs.

Then-Prime Minister Guy Verhofstadt (VLD) was rejected as a candidate for the presidency of the European Commission in June 2004.

In the European Committee of the Regions, Open VLD sits in the Renew Europe CoR group, with one full and two alternate members for the 2020-2025 mandate. Jean-Luc Vanraes is Coordinator in the CIVEX Commission.

Members holding notable public offices

European politics

Federal politics

Regional politics

Provincial politics

Electoral results

Chamber of Representatives

Senate

Regional

Brussels Parliament

Flemish Parliament

Provincial councils

European Parliament

International
The party is a member of the Liberal International, which was co-chaired by Annemie Neyts, member of Open VLD.

Presidents
 1992–1995 Guy Verhofstadt
 1995–1997 Herman De Croo
 1997–1999 Guy Verhofstadt
 1999–2004 Karel De Gucht
 2004 Dirk Sterckx
 2004–2009 Bart Somers
 2009 Guy Verhofstadt
 2009–2012 Alexander De Croo
 2012 Vincent Van Quickenborne
 2012–2020 Gwendolyn Rutten
 2020– Egbert Lachaert

Notable members
 Maggie De Block, Minister of Social Affairs and Health
 Fons Borginon, former VLD floor leader in the Belgian Chamber of Representatives
 Patricia Ceysens, former Flemish Minister of the Economy and former VLD floor leader in the Flemish Parliament
 Karel De Gucht, former party leader and former Minister of Foreign Affairs
 Patrick Dewael, former minister-president of Flanders and former Minister of Internal Affairs
 Margriet Hermans, former member of the Flemish Parliament and senator
 Marino Keulen, former Flemish Minister of Integration
 Goedele Liekens, sexologist and TV presenter
 Fientje Moerman, former vice-minister-president of Flanders
 Annemie Neyts, former party leader, former chairwoman of the Liberal International and former party leader of the ELDR Party.
 Karel Poma, former minister and member of parliament
 Bart Somers, former minister-president of Flanders and former party leader
 Bart Tommelein, Flemish Deputy Minister-President and Flemish Minister of Budget, Finance and Energy
 Jef Valkeniers, doctor and politician
 Dirk Van Mechelen, former Flemish Minister of Finance and Budget and Town and Country Planning
 Vincent Van Quickenborne, former minister of economy, also responsible for the simplification of the administration
 Guy Vanhengel, Brussels Minister of Finance and Budget
 Guy Verhofstadt, former party leader and former prime minister
 Marc Verwilghen, former minister of the Economy, Trade, Science and Energy

Notable former members
 Boudewijn Bouckaert, a former VLD board member who left the party subsequently to Dedecker's exclusion, believing the party turned "left-liberal". He and Dedecker are founders of a new political party, List Dedecker, later renamed Libertarian, Direct, Democratic.
 Hugo Coveliers, left the VLD to found his own political party VLOTT.
 Jean-Marie Dedecker, was excluded from the VLD after several conflicts with the top of the party. He asked for an economic policy more in favour of free markets and limited government and believed that the party was too closely aligned with the Socialists. He founded the List Dedecker party, later Libertarian, Direct, Democratic.
 Leo Govaerts, left the VLD to found his own political party Veilig Blauw (Safe Blue).
 Ward Beysen, left the VLD to found his own political party Liberal Appeal.
 Sihame El Kaouakibi, left the VLD after claims of embezzlement.

See also
 Contributions to liberal theory
 Liberaal Vlaams Verbond (LVV)
 Liberal Flemish Students' Union
 Liberal Archive
 Liberal democracy
 Liberales
 Liberalism
 Liberalism in Belgium
 Liberalism worldwide
 List of liberal parties

References

External links
 
 jongvld.be
 openvldvrouwen.be

Political parties established in 1992
1992 establishments in Belgium
Conservative liberal parties
Classical liberal parties
Liberal International
Liberal parties in Belgium
Flemish political parties in Belgium
Alliance of Liberals and Democrats for Europe Party member parties
Pro-European political parties in Belgium